Kim Jin-hyeon (Hanja: 金鎭鉉; ; born 6 July 1987) is a South Korean professional footballer who plays as a goalkeeper for Cerezo Osaka.

International career
Kim made 3 appearances for South Korea U-20 in the 2007 FIFA U-20 World Cup. He made his national team debut on 30 May 2012 in a friendly match against Spain.

Kim became the starting goalkeeper for the national team in the 2015 Asian Cup with the exception of the match against Kuwait. He kept a clean sheet throughout the tournament until the final against Australia, where he conceded two goals in a 2–1 defeat. He was later nominated for the Best Goalkeeper award in the tournament.

Kim has been the main goal keeper for Cerezo Osaka since 2009.  In the 2017 J-League season, Cerezo Osaka won two cups and a third in the league and won the Asian Football Confederation (AFC) Champions League qualification.

In May 2018 he was named in South Korea's preliminary 28 man squad for the 2018 FIFA World Cup in Russia.

Career statistics

Club
Updated to the start from 2023 season.

1Includes Japanese Super Cup and J1/J2 Playoffs.

International clean sheets

Results list South Korea's goal tally first.

Honours

Club
Cerezo Osaka
J. League Cup: 2017
Emperor's Cup: 2017
Japanese Super Cup: 2018

International
South Korea
EAFF East Asian Cup: 2017
AFC Asian Cup runner-up: 2015

References

External links

Profile at Cerezo Osaka 
Kim Jin-hyeon at yahoo.co.jp 

1987 births
Living people
Association football goalkeepers
South Korean footballers
South Korean expatriate footballers
2011 AFC Asian Cup players
2015 AFC Asian Cup players
J1 League players
J2 League players
Cerezo Osaka players
Expatriate footballers in Japan
South Korean expatriate sportspeople in Japan
2018 FIFA World Cup players
South Korea under-20 international footballers
South Korea international footballers
People from Suwon
2019 AFC Asian Cup players
Sportspeople from Gyeonggi Province